Ronald Christ Karabatsos (1933–2012) was an American character actor.

Early life
Karabatsos was born on April 22, 1933, in Elizabeth, New Jersey, USA, to Constantine and Antoinette Karabatsos, first-generation immigrants from Greece. The family lived in Union City, New Jersey, where young Ronald graduated from Emerson High School.

Military and police service
Upon graduating from high school, Karabatsos was drafted in the U.S. Army spending most of his service time in the Korean War. After he was released from the military, he joined the police department of his home city, retiring after twenty eight years as a homicide detective.

Movie career
In 1982, while still on the police force, Karabatsos was approached to act a part in the Sidney Lumet movie Prince of the City. Most New York critics and Roger Ebert wrote positive reviews on the movie. James Wolcott dissented, concluding that the film is "wearing its liberal pieties like a crown of thorns," although he reserved praise for Karabatsos' work, writing that he "carries his hulk with impressive menace as a slime-souled bail bondsman." Critic David S. Machlowitz, though agreeing with Wolcott's take on the movie, wrote that Karabatsos "is superb as [the] bloated, belligerent bail bondsman."

Karabatsos went on to act in some thirty movies and two hundred TV shows, moving to live in California. He starred in the 1982 made-for-TV-movie Hear No Evil as Lt. Lew Healy.

He died on April 17, 2012, five days before his 79th birthday, in Beaumont, California, from a non-communicable disease, survived by wife Janell, daughter Dawnne Rigsby, and an extended family.

Filmography

References

External links

1933 births
2012 deaths
Male actors from New Jersey
Actors from Elizabeth, New Jersey
American male television actors
American male film actors
American people of Greek descent
United States Army soldiers
United States Army personnel of the Korean War
People from Beaumont, California